Edenbridge may mean:

Edenbridge (band), a symphonic metal band from Austria
Edenbridge, Kent, a town in England
Edenbridge, Saskatchewan, a former Jewish settlement in Canada
Humber Valley Village, a neighbourhood in Toronto, Ontario, Canada, commonly referred to as Edenbridge-Humber Valley